Nepheronia pharis, the round-winged vagrant, is a butterfly in the family Pieridae. It is found in Sierra Leone, Guinea, Liberia, Ivory Coast, Ghana, Togo, Benin, Nigeria, Cameroon, Equatorial Guinea, the Republic of the Congo, Angola, the Central African Republic, the Democratic Republic of the Congo, Uganda, Kenya and Tanzania. The habitat consists of undisturbed primary lowland forests and riverine forests.

Subspecies
Nepheronia pharis pharis (Sierra Leone, coast and north-eastern Guinea, Liberia, Ivory Coast, Ghana, Togo, Benin, Nigeria, Cameroon, Equatorial Guinea, Congo, Angola, Central African Republic, Democratic Republic of the Congo, Uganda)
Nepheronia pharis silvanus (Stoneham, 1957) (Uganda, western Kenya, north-western Tanzania)

References

Butterflies described in 1836
pharis
Butterflies of Africa
Taxa named by Jean Baptiste Boisduval